Nerses Bedros XIX (17 January 1940 – 25 June 2015) was the patriarch of the Armenian Catholic Church.

He was the second son and the fifth of eight children born to Elias Taza and Josephine Azouz. He completed his primary and secondary studies at the College of the Brothers of the Christian Schools (Frères des écoles chrétiennes) in Cairo.

He felt a vocation for the priesthood very early in life and thus was sent to the Armenian Leonine Pontifical College in Rome in 1958 where he studied Philosophy and Theology at the Pontifical Gregorian University. His Bishop, Raphaël Bayan ordained him as a priest in Cairo on 15 August 1965. In Heliopolis he was known as Father Pierre Taza.

He served the parish of the Armenian Catholic Cathedral of the Annunciation in Cairo from 1965 to 1968 with the Rev John Kasparian who, in 1982, became Catholicos-Patriarch under the name of Hovhannes Bedros XVIII (John Peter XVIII Kasparian). From 1968 to 1990, Pierre Taza was curate of the parish of St Therese of Heliopolis in Cairo.

On 18 February 1990, he was ordained bishop of the Eparchy (Diocese) of Alexandria for Egypt and Sudan by the laying on of hands of Jean Pierre XVIII. From 1992 to 1997, as member of the Catholic Hierarchy of Egypt, he was the General Secretary of the Pastoral Council of the Catholic Church of Egypt.

As a member of the Synod of the Bishops of the Catholic Armenian Patriarch Church, he was: 
Member of the Council of the three Bishops to direct the Patriarchal Curie from 1993 to 1995 
President of the Patriarchal Commission for the Vocations from 1993 to 1995
Member of the Permanent Synod as of 1994

In October 1999, he was elected by the Bishops of the Holy Synod of the Catholic Armenian Synod, Catholicos-Patriarch of Cilicia of Armenian Catholics and took the name Nerses Bedros XIX.

He remained in this position until his death on June 25, 2015.

See also
 List of Armenian Catholic Patriarchs of Cilicia

References

External links
Biography on official site of the Armenian Catholic Church

1940 births
2015 deaths
21st-century Eastern Catholic bishops
20th-century Eastern Catholic bishops
Armenian Catholic Patriarchs of Cilicia
Armenian Eastern Catholics
Egyptian Eastern Catholics
Egyptian people of Armenian descent
Clergy from Cairo
Pontifical Gregorian University alumni
Eastern Catholic bishops in Africa